Sun-Dome, Sundome, or variation, may refer to:

Facilities
 Yakima SunDome, in Yakima, Washington, United States; a multipurpose arena
 USF Sun Dome, a multipurpose arena at the University of South Florida, Tampa, Florida, United States
 MTN Sundome, in Johannesburg, South Africa; an event venue 
 Sun Dome Fukui, in Echizen, Fukui, Japan; a multipurpose arena
 Sundome Nishi Station, a Fukui Railway Fukubu Line railway station located in Sabae, Fukui Prefecture, Japan.

Other uses
 Sundome a Japanese seinen manga comic book and media franchise
 Sundome, chapter 62 of Death Note Japanese manga comic, see List of Death Note chapters
 Sundome (song) 2012 song by the U.S. band Battles from the album Dross Glop

See also
 Dome (disambiguation)
 Sun (disambiguation)